Mary Elizabeth Smith (February 2, 1923 – November 12, 2017) was an American gossip columnist. She was known as "The Grand Dame of Dish". In the 1960s and early 1970s, she was the entertainment editor for the magazines Cosmopolitan and Sports Illustrated. Between 1976 and 2009, she wrote a self-titled gossip column for newspapers including New York Newsday, the New York Daily News and the New York Post that was syndicated in 60 to 70 other newspapers. On television, she appeared on Fox, E!, and WNBC.

Early life 
Smith was born on February 2, 1923, in Fort Worth, Texas. She graduated from the University of Texas with a degree in journalism in 1949.and worked for The Daily Texan and The Texas Ranger.

Career
Smith later moved to New York City, where she worked as a typist, proofreader, and reporter before she broke into the media world as a news producer for Mike Wallace at CBS Radio. She spent five years as a news producer for NBC-TV. She also worked for Allen Funt on Candid Camera.

In the late 1950s, Smith worked as a ghostwriter for the "Cholly Knickerbocker" gossip column syndicated in the Hearst newspapers. After leaving that column in the early 1960s, she began working for Helen Gurley Brown as the entertainment editor for the American version of Cosmopolitan, later working simultaneously as Sports Illustrateds entertainment editor as well.

On February 16, 1976, Smith began a self-titled gossip column for the New York Daily News. During the 1978 New York City newspaper strike, her Daily News editors asked her to appear daily on WNBC-TV's Live at Five, and she stayed with the program for eleven years. Her exposure on television made Smith a regular figure on the Manhattan social scene and provided fodder for her column, which had, by then, been syndicated to nearly seventy newspapers. She won an Emmy for her reporting on Live at Five for WNBC in 1985.

Smith was hired by Fox Broadcasting Company heads Barry Diller and Rupert Murdoch to develop a talk show, with Roger Ailes as her producer.

Smith was once reportedly the highest-paid print journalist in the United States. In 1991, shortly after her exclusive interviews with Ivana Trump at the time of her divorce from real-estate entrepreneur Donald Trump, Smith moved her column to New York Newsday, staying until that paper closed in 1995 and then continuing in both the Long Island Newsday and the New York Post simultaneously.  She worked for Fox News for seven years and was last on Fox & Friends. She was the only columnist to ever have her column printed in three major New York City papers at the same time.

In April 2005, Smith left Newsday following a contract dispute. The official discontinuation of her column came after several months of dispute among Smith, her lawyer David Blasband, and Newsday management. The matter was settled out of court and Smith continued at the New York Post and the Staten Island Advance.

On February 24, 2009, the Post announced that the paper would stop running Smith's column effective February 26, 2009 as a cost-cutting measure.

Smith, along with Lesley Stahl, Mary Wells Lawrence, and Joni Evans, was a founding member of wowOwow.com, a website for women to talk culture, politics, and gossip.

Smith was honored as The New Jewish Home's Eight Over Eighty Gala 2016 honoree.

Personal life
Smith married her college sweetheart, World War II bombardier George Edward Beeman, in 1945. She soon left him to enroll at the University of Texas, where her papers and memorabilia are kept in the Dolph Briscoe Center, and they divorced two years later. In 1957, she married Fred Lister; the couple divorced in 1962.

Smith acknowledged her bisexuality (or as she referred to it, "gender neutrality") in her memoirs, but in the December 5, 2000 issue of The Advocate, she dug deeper and confided in editor-in-chief Judy Wieder that it was not in her nature to be a role model in the LGBT movement.  However, she admitted, "I think that my relationships with women were always much more emotionally satisfying and comfortable [than with men]. And a lot of my relationships with men were more flirtatious and adversarial. I just never felt I was wife material. I always felt that I was a great girlfriend." Beginning in the late 1970s, the archaeologist Iris Love lived with Smith romantically for 15 years.

Smith was a good friend of Texas Governor Ann Richards, and helped her to acculturate to New York City society after leaving Texas. Smith was also good friends with Texan pundit and writer Molly Ivins, also a friend of Richards.

Smith raised millions of dollars for charities, $6 million for Literacy Partners, millions for AMFAR, the New York Landmarks Conservancy, PAL, and the Mayor's Fund to Advance New York City under Mayor Michael Bloomberg.

Death
On November 12, 2017, Smith died at her home in Manhattan, New York, of natural causes at the age of 94.

Bibliography

References

External links 
Liz Smith interview with Larry King
Liz Smith at wowOwow

1923 births
2017 deaths
American gossip columnists
American women columnists
LGBT people from Texas
People from Fort Worth, Texas
Bisexual women
Journalists from New York City
Journalists from Texas
University of Texas alumni
21st-century American women
American bisexual writers